Ave Maria lace is a lace manufactured until the mid-19th century, largely in Dieppe. The lace is very narrow and was chiefly made by peasants, from whom the name originates.

References

Lace
Dieppe